Colpes is a village and municipality in Catamarca Province in northwestern Argentina, located in the Ambato Department.

References

Populated places in Catamarca Province